William Soone or Zoone (fl. 1540–1575) was an English jurist and cartographer.

Life
Soone was educated at Cambridge University, where he matriculated at Michaelhouse in 1544. He graduated B.A. 1547, and proceeded M.A. at some date after 1549. He became doctor of civil and canon laws, probably at some university on the continent. The bursars' accounts of Caius College show that he was resident at Gonville Hall, probably as a fellow, from 1548 to 1555. In 1561 he became regius professor of civil law, and in June of that year was admitted fellow of Trinity Hall.

He would not conform to the Church of England, and, leaving Cambridge, went abroad. His successor in the professorship, William Clerke, was appointed in 1563. Soone is said to have resided at Paris, Dol, Freiburg, and Padua, and to have been a professor of law for some time at Leuven. From Leuven he went, most likely, to Antwerp, where he acted as assistant to Abraham Ortelius.

In 1572 he was at Cologne. He then passed to Rome, and had some papal appointment.

Works
In Cologne he published ‘Gulielmi Sooni Vantesdeni Auditor sive Pomponius Mela disputator de Situ Orbis’. Part of this rare book, the ‘Novi incolæ orbis terrarum,’ is copied from that of Arnold Mylius and published by Ortelius in the 1570 edition of the ‘Theatrum.’ Accordingly Ortelius complained, and Soone offered explanations dated from Cologne, 31 August 1572.

Soone also copied the map of Cambridge which Richard Lyne had drawn for John Caius's ‘History of the University’ (1574), and published his copy in Georg Braun and Hogenberg's ‘Civitates Orbis terrarum’ (1575?). With this map went a description of the university.

References

Attribution

Year of birth missing
Year of death missing
16th-century English educators
Alumni of Trinity College, Cambridge
English legal professionals
English cartographers
16th-century cartographers
Regius Professors of Civil Law (University of Cambridge)
Fellows of Trinity Hall, Cambridge
Fellows of Gonville and Caius College, Cambridge